Basford North railway station was a railway station which served Basford and Bulwell in Nottinghamshire, England. It was close to the River Leen, which the line crossed on a nine-arch brick viaduct.

History 
Built by the Great Northern Railway on its Derbyshire Extension in 1875–6 the station was originally called Dob Park, as it was built on land belonging to that estate, but was quickly renamed to Basford and Bulwell and later renamed again to Basford North in order to avoid confusion with the nearby Midland Railway station originally named Basford which opened in 1848.

The station closed to passengers in 1964 and to goods three years later.

Station masters

Mr. Snell 1907   - 1910 (also station master at Basford)
J. Davis 1910 - 1922 (formerly station master at Spondon)
Louis B. Parley ???? - 1928  (afterwards station master at Spalding)
T. Hibbert 1931 - ????
W.W. Capon 1934 - 1936  (afterwards station master at Nottingham Victoria)
A. Burton 1936 - ???? (formerly station master at Beighton and also Woodhouse. Also appointed station master of New Basford)
W.H. Burton 1940   - ???? (formerly station master at Woodhouse)
Herbert Bonner 1943 - 1945
G.O. Smith 1946 - 1949 (formerly station master at Wrexham (Central), afterwards station master at Finsbury Park)
A. Shepherd 1950 (formerly station master at Wrexham (Central))

Present day 
An industrial estate and a housing development completed in 2019 occupy the former site of the station.

References

 
 
 

Disused railway stations in Nottinghamshire
Railway stations in Great Britain opened in 1876
Railway stations in Great Britain closed in 1964
Former Great Northern Railway stations
Beeching closures in England